Srećko Sekulović (born 12 June 1962), credited as Szrecsko Szekulovics in Hungary, is a Serbian professional basketball coach and former player.

Playing career 
Sekulović played for Spartak Subotica, Cypriot teams Doxa and ENAD Nicosia, and Hungarian teams Hübner Nyíregyháza and Debreceni Vadkakasok.

Coaching career 
Sekulović coached KK Satex Subotica, Spartak, Falco Szombathely, Ergonom Best, Atlas Beograd, Swisslion Takovo, Alba Fehérvár, PVSK Panthers, Kaposvári, Târgu Mureș, Jászberényi KSE, Atomerőmű SE, and Fair Play.

In 2020, Sekulović joined SZTE-Szedeák. On 8 November 2021, he resigned as their head coach. On 10 November 2021, Spartak Office Shoes hired Sekulović as their new head coach.

Career achievements 
As head coach
 Hungarian I/A League champion: 1 (with Falco Szombathely: 2007–08)
 Second Basketball League of Serbia champion: 1 (with Spartak: 2021–22)
 YUBA B League champion: 1 (with Swisslion Takovo: 2005–06)
 League Cup of Serbia winner: 1 (with Ergonom: 2002–03)

References

External links
 Coach Profile at eurobasket.com
 Coach Profile at mkkspartak.rs

1962 births
Living people
KK Beopetrol/Atlas Beograd coaches
KK Ergonom coaches
KK Lions/Swisslion Vršac coaches
KK Spartak Subotica coaches
KK Spartak Subotica players
Serbian men's basketball coaches
Serbian men's basketball players
Serbian expatriate basketball people in Cyprus
Serbian expatriate basketball people in Hungary
Serbian expatriate basketball people in Romania
People from Vrbas, Serbia
Yugoslav men's basketball players